Fabrizio Schiavi born  in Ponte dell'Olio near Piacenza (Italy), is a graphic designer and type designer.

Schiavi is particularly known for the very large font project PragmataPro, the monospaced family designed optimized for screen designed to be the ideal font for coding, math and engineering.

Biography
Schiavi studied Graphic Design in 1989 at Istituto d’Arte Paolo Toschi in Parma. After working for three years as graphic designer for the Italian record company Expanded Music, he left to set up his own graphic design studio, FSD (Fabrizio Schiavi Design), in Piacenza.

Fonts
 Sys, a geometric TrueType handhinted font
 Pragmata, a monospaced font designed for programmers 
 PragmataPro, the enhanced version of Pragmata with more than 7000 glyphs per weight
 Sirucanorm, the rounded sans-serif version of Siruca custom font
 Exit, a narrow sans-serif available at MyFonts
 D^44, available at MyFonts
 Sidewalker, available at MyFonts
 Lithium, available at MyFonts
 Eco, available at MyFonts
 Eco-Nomico, available at MyFonts
 FF Steel, available at FontShop
 FF Trade01, available at FontShop
 FF 9600-0069, available at FontShop
 FF GeäbOil, available at FontShop
 FF Mode01 available at FontShop
 Monica, available at MyFonts
 MonicaDue, available at MyFonts

Custom Fonts
 Abitare Sans, designed for Abitare of RCS MediaGroup
 Widiba Sans, Serif, Display, Script, designed for Widiba of Banca Monte dei Paschi di Siena Group with jekill & hide studio
 CP Company, designed for C.P. Company
 Virna, designed for MTV Italia
 Siruca, designed for Al Hamra Tower wayfinding
 Be and Bee, designed for Beretta
 Nove, designed for Nike, Inc.

Web Sites
 Mandarina Duck, mandarinaduck.com, art direction Sartoria Comunicazione
 C.P. Company, cpcompany.com, art direction Fabrizio Schiavi
 Ferrari, club.ferrari.com, committed by Orchestra
 Vic Matié, vicmatie.it, art direction Stefano Meneghetti
 Search for Art, searchforart.org, sponsored by Mandarina Duck committed by Sartoria Comunicazione
 Duccio Grassi Architects, ducciograssi.it, art direction Fabrizio Schiavi

Corporate Identities
 Philip Morris Company, proposal, committed by Leo Burnett
 Mandarina Duck, guide line, committed by Sartoria Comunicazione
 YU
 Quality Bau
 R&M per comunicare
 Expanded Music
 Radio Italia Network
 Terratrema Film

References

External links
Fabrizio Schiavi home page
Portfolio in pdf
 Fabrizio Schiavi Design page at MyFonts
 Fabrizio Schiavi page at FontShop
 Fabrizio Schiavi page at Typetoken
 Fabrizio Schiavi page at Typecache
 Fabrizio Schiavi page at Luc Devroye site
 Klingspor Museum about Fabrizio Schiavi.

Italian graphic designers
1971 births
Living people